The Neiva N621 Universal is a Brazilian propeller-driven basic trainer and ground attack aircraft manufactured by Indústria Aeronáutica Neiva. It is a cantilever, low-wing monoplane of all-metal construction, with retractable undercarriage and side-by-side seating.

Design and development
The Universal was designed in 1963 as a new primary trainer for the Brazilian Air Force, as a replacement for the T-6 Texan and Fokker S-11/S-12 types then in use.  The prototype (Registration PP-ZTW) first flew on 29 April 1966. The Brazilian Air Force ordered 150 aircraft as the T-25 Universal, and increased this order in 1978 by an additional 28 aircraft. A further developed version (designated the YT-25B Universal II) first flew on 22 October 1978 but was not put into production.

The Universal was also adopted as a counter-insurgency aircraft. It was later replaced by the Tucano in both the advanced training and attack roles, but it is still used as a primary and basic trainer at the Academia da Força Aérea Brasileira (Brazilian Air Force Academy).

Ten aircraft were ordered by the Chilean Army. These aircraft were later transferred to the Chilean Air Force. In 1983 five FACh T-25s were donated to the Paraguayan Air Force.

In 2005, the Brazilian Air Force donated six T-25s to the Fuerza Aérea Paraguaya and another six to the Fuerza Aérea Boliviana.

Operators

Bolivian Air Force

Brazilian Air Force

Chilean Air Force
Chilean Army

Paraguayan Air Force

Specifications (Universal)

References

External links

Brazilian Air Force's website with the description of the type (in Portuguese)

Universal
1960s Brazilian military trainer aircraft
Low-wing aircraft
Single-engined tractor aircraft